Tomáš Havránek (born May 4, 1998) is a Czech professional ice hockey player. He is currently playing for HC Dukla Jihlava of the Czech 1.liga.

Havránek previously played for HC Kometa Brno of the Czech Extraliga and made his debut for the team during the 2015-16 Czech Extraliga season. He also had loan spells at Slavia Třebíč, HC Karlovy Vary and HC Dukla Jihlava, then he joined Slavia Třebíč again, in 2020 he signed a contract with HC Dukla Jihlava.

References

External links

1998 births
Living people
Czech ice hockey forwards
HC Dukla Jihlava players
SK Horácká Slavia Třebíč players
HC Karlovy Vary players
HC Kometa Brno players
People from Žďár nad Sázavou
Sportspeople from the Vysočina Region